John Michael Farm is a historic farm complex located in the Delaware Water Gap National Recreation Area at Middle Smithfield Township, Monroe County, Pennsylvania.  The farmhouse was built about 1875, and is a two-story frame building on a fieldstone foundation in a Late Victorian style.  It has a slate roof and stucco coated flared brick chimney.  Also on the property are a one-room wash house (c. 1875), large frame Pennsylvania bank barn with a shed addition and silo, and a wagon shed.

It was added to the National Register of Historic Places in 1980.

References

Farms on the National Register of Historic Places in Pennsylvania
Houses completed in 1875
Houses in Monroe County, Pennsylvania
National Register of Historic Places in Monroe County, Pennsylvania